Y. Ravindranath Rao (born 9 July 1956) is an Indian sociologist and researcher. He is known for his studies on tribes and castes particularly those belonging to Konkani-speaking groups.

Education  

Ravindranath Rao had his early education in Udupi district. He did his master's degree in sociology with a rank and qualified in Gandhian studies from Karnatak University, Dharwad. He is also qualified in Bioethics from Manipal University. He was awarded Ph.D. from Mangalore University in 1995.

Career 

He was principal of Saint Mary's Syrian College, Brahmavara of Mangalore University, Karnataka. He is a visiting professor of many universities in South India. He has many UGC and NGO funded research projects to his credit. He presented and chaired in World Congresses held in South Africa, Sweden and Japan. Recently he has been appointed Anthropologist and Sociologist to the Karnataka State Commission for Backward Classes.

Recognition 

His study on Kudubis explored many issues in which non recognition as Scheduled Tribe is a prominent one. In 2003, Goa state declared Kudubis as Scheduled Tribe and scheduling Kudubis of Karnataka is in the process.

Selected works 

 2003 – Tribal Tradition and Change: A study of Kudubis of South India, Mangalore: Mangala publications
 2014 – Report of a Socio-Economic Survey of Kudubis of Karnataka, Mangalore: World Konkani Centre
 2017 – Konkani Kharvis of Karnataka: A Socio-Economic Survey Report, Mangalore: World Konkani Centre
 2021- Bindeshwar Pathak : A Social Reformer, New Delhi: Rupa publications

References 

People from Udupi district
Mangalore University
1956 births
Living people